Darbandak   is a village in the Khwahan District of Badakhshan in north-eastern Afghanistan.

References 

Populated places in Khwahan District